Conus glicksteini is a species of sea snail, a marine gastropod mollusk in the family Conidae, the cone snails and their allies.

Like all species within the genus Conus, these snails are predatory and venomous. They are capable of "stinging" humans, therefore live ones should be handled carefully or not at all.

Description 
Original description: "Shell small for genus, thin, delicate, with low spire; body whorl smooth and shiny, with only few weak spiral threads around anterior tip; color varying from salmon-pink to pinkish-lavender, with evenly spaced pale tan lines or rows of dots around body whorl (holotype salmon-pink with only few rows of pale tan dots around mid-body); all specimens with paler band around mid-body and around shoulder; spire whorls with numerous pale orange, thin, crescent-shaped flammules; interior of aperture pink; protoconch and early whorls bright pink in all specimens, regardless of body whorl color: aperture narrow, shoulder slightly rounded."

The maximum recorded shell length is 22 mm.

Distribution
Locus typicus: "(Dredged from) 400 feet depth off Palm Beach Island, 
Palm Beach County, Florida, USA."

This marine species occurs off Eastern Florida.

Habitat 
Minimum recorded depth is 122 m. Maximum recorded depth is 122 m.

References

 Petuch E.J. (1987). New Caribbean Molluscan Faunas. Charlottesville, Virginia: The Coastal Education and Research Foundation. 154 pp., 29 pls; addendum 2 pp., 1 pl.
 Filmer R.M. (2001). A Catalogue of Nomenclature and Taxonomy in the Living Conidae 1758 - 1998. Backhuys Publishers, Leiden. 388pp
 Tucker J.K. & Tenorio M.J. (2009) Systematic classification of Recent and fossil conoidean gastropods. Hackenheim: Conchbooks. 296 pp.
 Rabiller M. & Richard G. (2019). Conidae offshore de Guadeloupe : Description du matériel dragué lors de l'expédition KARUBENTHOS 2 contenant de nouvelles espèces. Xenophora Taxonomy. 24: 3-31.

External links
 The Conus Biodiversity website
 
 Puillandre N., Duda T.F., Meyer C., Olivera B.M. & Bouchet P. (2015). One, four or 100 genera? A new classification of the cone snails. Journal of Molluscan Studies. 81: 1–23

glicksteini
Gastropods described in 1987